Travis Oliver (born 18 March) is a British actor. He is possibly best known for his role as Oliver Ryan in the ITV series Footballers' Wives: Extra Time between 2005 and 2006. He's also made appearances in BBC's Doctor Who (2007) and the film Lesbian Vampire Killers (2009).

Biography

He was born in Belgium, but grew up near Farnham, Surrey, where he attended Frensham Heights School, at the same time as fellow actors Hattie Morahan, Tobias Menzies, Rufus Hound and Jim Sturgess. However, it wasn't until after gaining a degree in Economics from University College London that he began to pursue acting, training at Drama Studio London.

His first television role was as Jake McQueen in the BBC series Doctors. He has since gone on to appear in programmes such as Holby City, Footballers' Wives: Extra Time, the BBC's 2004 adaptation of North & South, and the Doctor Who episode "Gridlock" as Milo.

At the 2006 Edinburgh Fringe Festival, he played the title character in the Fringe First nominated one-man show, Diamond Johnny Ray, by Cathianne Hall.

2009 saw his first appearance in a major feature film, playing the American actor John Hoyt in Me and Orson Welles, directed by Richard Linklater.

In 2015 he returned to the world of Doctor Who playing Chris Cwej, companion of the Seventh Doctor, in the Big Finish adaptation of Russell T Davies' Virgin New Adventures novel Damaged Goods. He reprised the role for adaptations of Original Sin and Cold Fusion.

Filmography

References

External links

Living people
English male television actors
English male film actors
English male stage actors
Alumni of University College London
People educated at Frensham Heights School
Alumni of the Drama Studio London
Year of birth missing (living people)